The 1999 UNCAF Nations Cup was a UNCAF Nations Cup held in San Jose, Costa Rica in March 1999. The host team won the tournament's final group. Costa Rica then qualified automatically, alongside second-placed Guatemala and third-placed Honduras for the 2000 CONCACAF Gold Cup.

Squads
For a complete list of all participating squads see UNCAF Nations Cup 1999 squads

Stadium

First round
All games were played in San José, Costa Rica.

Group A

Group B

Final round

Champions

Costa Rica, Guatemala and Honduras qualified automatically for the 2000 CONCACAF Gold Cup. El Salvador entered a play-off for qualification with Canada, Haiti and Cuba.

All Star Team
As voted for by the CONCACAF technical Commission. A squad rather than an eleven was selected:

Goalkeepers:
 Wilmer Cruz
 Erick Lonnis

Defenders:
 Jervis Drummond
 Julio Girón
 José Hernández
 Ninrod Medina
 Erick Miranda
 Milton Reyes

Midfielders:
 Jorge Caballero
 Jeaustin Campos
 Robel Benárdez
 Rolando Fonseca
 Guillermo García
 Christian Santamaría

Forwards:
 Milton Nunez
 Carlos Pavón
 José Ramírez
 Jorge Rodas

 
1999 in Central American football
1999
1999
1998–99 in Salvadoran football
1998–99 in Costa Rican football
1998–99 in Honduran football
1998–99 in Belizean football
1998–99 in Guatemalan football
1998–99 in Nicaraguan football